Tsaiodendron is a genus of flowering plants belonging to the family Euphorbiaceae.

Its native range is China (Yunnan).

Species:
 Tsaiodendron dioicum Y.H.Tan, Z.Zhou & B.J.Gu

References

Euphorbiaceae
Euphorbiaceae genera